Hedi Dhaoui (born 15 July 1935) is a Tunisian long-distance runner. He competed in the marathon at the 1960 Summer Olympics.

References

External links
 

1935 births
Living people
Athletes (track and field) at the 1960 Summer Olympics
Tunisian male long-distance runners
Tunisian male marathon runners
Olympic athletes of Tunisia
Sportspeople from Tunis
Olympic male marathon runners
20th-century Tunisian people